Sovia hyrtacus, the bicolour ace or white-branded ace, is a butterfly belonging to the family Hesperiidae. It is found in Western Ghats from Goa to Kerala.

The larvae feed on Ochlandra travancorica.

Description
In 1897, Lionel de Nicéville described this butterfly as:

References

Hesperiinae
Butterflies of Asia